The Department of Public Relations, Madhya Pradesh commonly referred to as Jansamparak Madhya Pradesh is an agency within  the Government of Madhya Pradesh. It was established by the Home Department in 2006. Its headquarter is based in the capital of Bhopal at Jansampark Sanchalanalaya. 

It has been charged with "disseminating information on various activities of the Government to the people through the media and providing feedback to the Government on important matters reflected in the media. DPR is also charged with activities connected with cultural affairs."

Functions 

The main functions of the Department of Public Relations are to organize visit of press representatives to different areas, accreditation of press representatives, the issuing of certificates, publication, displaying classified advertisements in newspaper, centralized payment of bills, publications of publicity literature in different languages regarding the achievements, development of programs of the Government, publicity of the achievements of the government within and outside the state through cultural program.

It also disseminates and propagates government policies, programs, schemes and achievements, to enhance public awareness. The department also documents the progress and achievements of various departments.

The department assists the state government in coordinating with various departments by capturing public perception and feedback on different issues, through analysis of news published in the media. In addition, the Department of Public Relations responds quickly to communicate the government's view point among general public through media, disseminate policies, programs and achievements of various departments for educating people and mass communication by performing role of facilitator by using various, method and resources of educating people and mass communication. Formation of creativeness for publicity of programs, schemes and achievements of various departments through poster, pamphlet, folder, booklet, etc. and to facilitate the advertisement work.

District Divisions

Each District in Madhya Pradesh have office of the Department.

References

External links 
 Department Public Relations
 Government of Madhya Pradesh Department Portal
 Jansampark MP

Government of Madhya Pradesh